Rudolph Kallio (December 14, 1892 – April 6, 1979) was a pitcher in Major League Baseball who played for two different teams between   and . Listed at 5' 10", 160 lb., Kallio batted and threw right-handed. He was born in Portland, Oregon.

Kallio entered the majors in 1918 with the Detroit Tigers, playing for them two years before joining the Boston Red Sox. In his rookie season, he showed promise as a solid starter for Detroit, going 8-14 with 70 strikeouts and a 3.62 ERA in 181⅓ innings pitched. But he developed a chronic bursitis that eventually ended his career, pitching only 22 innings the next season. He went 1-4 for the Red Sox in 1925, his last major league season.

In a three-year career, Kallio posted a 9-18 record with a 4.17 ERA in 49 appearances, including 27 starts, 10 complete games, two shutouts, one save, 75 strikeouts, and 222⅓ innings of work.

Following his playing career, Kallio worked as a coach and traveling secretary for the Portland Beavers (1943) and later scouted for the Chicago Cubs (1946). He died in Newport, Oregon at age 86.

External links

Boston Red Sox players
Detroit Tigers players
Chicago Cubs scouts
Major League Baseball pitchers
Baseball players from Oregon
1892 births
1979 deaths
People from Newport, Oregon
Las Cruces Farmers players
San Francisco Seals (baseball) players
Butte Miners players
Great Falls Electrics players
Salt Lake City Bees players
Seattle Indians players
Portland Beavers players
Saskatoon Quakers (baseball) players
El Paso Mackmen players